Thạnh Phú is a commune (xã) and village in Cái Nước District, Cà Mau Province, in Vietnam.

Populated places in Cà Mau province
Communes of Cà Mau province